Aleksei Aleksandrovich Druzin (born 3 January 1987) is a Russian professional football player who plays as a central midfielder for FC Start Yeysk.

Club career
He made his Russian Premier League debut for FC SKA-Khabarovsk on 16 July 2017 in a game against FC Zenit Saint Petersburg.

External links
 
 

1987 births
Sportspeople from Volgograd
Living people
Russian footballers
Association football midfielders
FC Tekstilshchik Kamyshin players
FC KAMAZ Naberezhnye Chelny players
FC Orenburg players
FC Irtysh Omsk players
FC SKA-Khabarovsk players
Russian Premier League players
FC Rotor Volgograd players